The 1944–45 Southern League Cup was the fifth edition of the regional war-time football tournament.

Group stage

Group A

Group B

Group C

Group D

Semi-finals

Final

Teams

References

External links
Southern League Cup at Scottish Football Historical Archive (archived version, 2015)

season
1944–45 in Scottish football